Stenocercus dumerilii is a species of lizard in the family Tropiduridae. The species is endemic to Brazil.

Etymology
The specific name, dumerilii, is in honor of French herpetologist André Marie Constant Duméril.

Geographic range
S. dumerilii is found in northeastern Brazil, in the Brazilian states of Maranhão, northeastern Pará, and Tocantins.

Habitat
The preferred natural habitat of S. dumerilii is forest.

Diet
S. dumerilii preys upon a wide variety of arthropods.

Reproduction
S. dumerilii is oviparous. Clutch size is 2–6 eggs.

References

Further reading
Ávila-Pires TCS (1995). "Lizards of Brazilian Amazonia (Reptilia: Squamata)". Zoologische Verhandelingen 299: 1–706. (Stenocercus dumerilii, new combination, p. 143).
Boulenger GA (1885). Catalogue of the Lizards in the British Museum (Natural History). Second Edition. Volume II. Iguanidæ .... London: Trustees of the British Museum (Natural History). (Taylor and Francis, printers). xiii + 497 pp. + Plates I–XXIV. (Liocephalus dumerilii, new combination, p. 170).
Burt CE, Burt MD (1933). "A Preliminary Check List of the Lizards of South America". Transactions of the Academy of Sciences of St. Louis 28: 1–104. (Leiocephalus dumerilii, new combination, p. 27).
Steindachner F (1867). "Reptilien ". pp. 1–98. In: Reise der Österreichischen Fregatte Novara um die Erde in den Jahren 1857, 1858, 1859 unter den Befehlen des Commodore B. von Wüllerstorf-Urbair. Zoologischer Theil. Erster Bande. Vienna: Karl Gerold's Sohn. (Ophryoessoides dumerilii, new species, pp. 33–34). (in German).

Stenocercus
Reptiles described in 1867
Endemic fauna of Brazil
Reptiles of Brazil
Taxa named by Franz Steindachner